Robert DeShaun "Tractor" Traylor (February 1, 1977 – May 11, 2011) was an American professional basketball player. He got his nickname because of his hulking frame. Traylor was the sixth pick in the 1998 NBA draft and played seven seasons in the league (from 1998–1999 through 2004–2005). He averaged 4.8 points per game, mainly as a reserve center and forward.

High school and college 
Traylor was a McDonald's All-American the same year as Kevin Garnett, Vince Carter and Paul Pierce. He attended the University of Michigan. Standing  and weighing in excess of 300 pounds, he joined a frontcourt for the Wolverines that included Maurice Taylor and Maceo Baston. That year, Traylor broke a backboard while dunking in a game against Ball State. Traylor helped lead the Wolverines to the 1997 National Invitation Tournament title, and was named the tournament's most valuable player. His junior year was his best, as he averaged 16.2 points and 10 rebounds while leading his team to the inaugural Big Ten tournament championship and second round of the NCAA tournament as a three seed.

Traylor was one of the former Michigan players whose ties to booster Ed Martin roiled the program. During his freshman year, Traylor broke his arm in a car accident while out with teammates and recruiting prospect Mateen Cleaves (who ended up going to rival Michigan State). That accident triggered a six-year investigation into the Wolverine program. Martin, who died in 2003 at 69, pleaded guilty in 2002 to conspiracy to launder money and told federal prosecutors he took gambling money, combined it with other funds and lent $616,000 to Traylor, Chris Webber and two other Wolverine players dating to when they were still in high school. Traylor received three years' probation for tax fraud.

Due to NCAA violations connected to the case (principally the compromising of the amateur status of Traylor, Webber and Taylor), Michigan withdrew from consideration for the 2003 NCAA tournament, lost scholarships and was placed on probation. The school also vacated the records of every game in which Traylor played from its record book. Traylor also had to surrender his MVP award for the 1997 NIT, as well as his MVP award from the 1998 Big Ten tournament. Murray-Wright High School in Detroit, where Traylor played high school basketball, voluntarily forfeited its entire 1994–95 season (Traylor's senior season).

NBA career 
In the 1998 NBA draft, Traylor was drafted by the Dallas Mavericks in the first round (with the sixth pick), then traded to the Milwaukee Bucks for Pat Garrity and German prospect Dirk Nowitzki. Many rank this as one of the most lopsided trades in NBA history, as Nowitzki would go onto a 21-season career with the Mavericks, while Garrity was shortly thereafter traded by the Mavericks for future Hall of Famer, Steve Nash.

In the 2005 offseason, Traylor had surgery on his aorta. He then signed on with the New Jersey Nets for the 2005–06 NBA season, but—due to his failing a physical examination—the deal was scrapped. Traylor battled weight problems throughout his career.

International career 
Traylor played in Turkey for Antalya Kepez Belediyesi, in Italy with the Lega Basket Serie A club NSB Napoli, in México for Halcones UV Xalapa, and in Puerto Rico with the Cangrejeros de Santurce and Vaqueros de Bayamón. Traylor was selected as 2010 Defensive Player of the Year of Baloncesto Superior Nacional. Traylor's last game was played on April 26, 2011, against San German, where he tallied five minutes of playing time with no points scored and two personal fouls.

Career statistics

College

|-
| align="left" | 1995–96
| align="left" | Michigan
| 22 || 4 || 19.9 || .554 || .000 || .548 || 5.9 || 0.5 || 0.9 || 0.7 || 9.0
|-
| align="left" | 1996–97
| align="left" | Michigan
| 35 || 35 || 27.3 || .556 || .000 || .455 || 7.7 || 0.9 || 1.1 || 1.0 || 13.1
|-
| align="left" | 1997–98
| align="left" | Michigan
| 34 || 34 || 32.1 || .579 || .000 || .642 || 10.1 || 2.6 || 1.3 || 1.4 || 16.2
|- class="sortbottom"
| style="text-align:center;" colspan="2"| Career
| 91 || 73 || 27.3 || .566 || .000 || .545 || 8.2 || 1.5 || 1.1 || 1.1 || 13.3
|}

NBA

Regular season

|-
| align="left" | 1998–99
| align="left" | Milwaukee
| 49 || 43 || 16.0 || .537 || .000 || .538 || 3.7 || 0.8 || 0.9 || 0.9 || 5.3
|-
| align="left" | 1999–00
| align="left" | Milwaukee
| 44 || 16 || 10.2 || .475 || .000 || .603 || 2.6 || 0.5 || 0.6 || 0.6 || 3.6
|-
| align="left" | 2000–01
| align="left" | Cleveland
| 70 || 7 || 17.3 || .497 || .000 || .567 || 4.3 || 0.9 || 0.7 || 1.1 || 5.7
|-
| align="left" | 2001–02
| align="left" | Charlotte
| 61 || 1 || 11.1 || .426 || 1.000 || .631 || 3.1 || 0.6 || 0.4 || 0.6 || 3.7
|-
| align="left" | 2002–03
| align="left" | New Orleans
| 69 || 0 || 12.3 || .443 || .333 || .648 || 3.8 || 0.7 || 0.7 || 0.5 || 3.9
|-
| align="left" | 2003–04
| align="left" | New Orleans
| 71 || 0 || 13.3 || .505 || .400 || .547 || 3.7 || 0.6 || 0.5 || 0.5 || 5.1
|-
| align="left" | 2004–05
| align="left" | Cleveland
| 74 || 6 || 17.9 || .444 || .000 || .539 || 4.5 || 0.8 || 0.7 || 0.7 || 5.5
|- class="sortbottom"
| style="text-align:center;" colspan="2"| Career
| 438 || 73 || 14.3 || .474 || .167 || .577 || 3.7 || 0.7 || 0.6 || 0.7 || 4.8
|}

Playoffs

|-
| align="left" | 1998–99
| align="left" | Milwaukee
| 3 || 1 || 15.0 || .778 || .000 || .500 || 4.0 || 0.7 || 0.7 || 1.3 || 5.3
|-
| align="left" | 1999–00
| align="left" | Milwaukee
| 1 || 0 || 4.0 || .000 || .000 || .000 || 2.0 || 1.0 || 0.0 || 1.0 || 0.0
|-
| align="left" | 2001–02
| align="left" | Charlotte
| 8 || 0 || 7.8 || .350 || .000 || .667 || 2.0 || 0.4 || 0.3 || 0.3 || 2.3
|-
| align="left" | 2002–03
| align="left" | New Orleans
| 6 || 0 || 15.7 || .455 || .000 || .250 || 5.0 || 0.7 || 0.5 || 0.8 || 3.5
|-
| align="left" | 2003–04
| align="left" | New Orleans
| 4 || 0 || 10.0 || .444 || .000 || .667 || 2.5 || 0.3 || 0.8 || 0.3 || 2.5
|- class="sortbottom"
| style="text-align:center;" colspan="2"| Career
| 22 || 1 || 11.1 || .459 || .000 || .529 || 3.2 || 0.5 || 0.5 || 0.6 || 3.0
|}

Death 
On May 11, 2011, Traylor was found dead at his apartment in Isla Verde, Puerto Rico, of an apparent massive heart attack. Traylor was talking to his wife on the phone at the time; the connection was suddenly lost, at which point his wife Raye Traylor alerted team officials to investigate. ESPN reported that Traylor had died of a heart attack.

Former coach Paul Silas commented on Traylor's death, saying, "It's just a shock and hard to believe."

See also 
List of basketball players who died during their careers

References

Further information 
Enlund, Tom. "Lighter Traylor still big on talent." Milwaukee Journal-Sentinel. Thursday June 25, 1998. 3C. Google News 193 of 205.
"Michigan's Traylor is turning professional." St. Louis Post-Dispatch. March 28, 1998. Page 13.

External links 
 

 NBA Draft busts #16
 Robert Traylor @ Basketball-Reference.com

1977 births
2011 deaths
African-American basketball players
All-American college men's basketball players
American expatriate basketball people in Italy
American expatriate basketball people in Mexico
American expatriate basketball people in Spain
American expatriate basketball people in Turkey
American men's basketball players
American people convicted of tax crimes
Basketball players from Detroit
Cangrejeros de Santurce basketball players
Charlotte Hornets players
Ciudad de Vigo Básquet players
Cleveland Cavaliers players
Dallas Mavericks draft picks
Halcones de Xalapa players
Kepez Belediyesi S.K. players
McDonald's High School All-Americans
Michigan Wolverines men's basketball players
Milwaukee Bucks players
New Orleans Hornets players
Parade High School All-Americans (boys' basketball)
Power forwards (basketball)
Murray–Wright High School alumni
20th-century African-American sportspeople
21st-century African-American sportspeople